A concert program (in American English) or concert programme (in British English) is a selection and ordering, or programming, of pieces to be performed at an occasion, or concert. Programs may be influenced by the available ensemble of instruments, by performer ability or skill, by theme (historical, programmatic, or technical), by musical concerns (such as form), or by allowable time. For example, a brass ensemble will perform an "all brass" program, the pieces of which may be chosen by a theme, such as "all Bach", and the chosen pieces may be ordered so that they build in intensity as the concert progresses. Concert programs may be put together by ensembles, conductors, or ensemble directors, and are often explained in program notes.

Program notes or annotated concert programs are common where contemporary or classical music is being performed. These were introduced in Edinburgh and London in the 1840s, first for chamber music concerts, notably by John Ella and his Musical Union, under the name "Synoptical Analysis". They became common in symphony concerts in the 1850s. In 1862, the Viennese critic Eduard Hanslick considered this particularly necessary for the English middle class: "Feeling usually uncertain about things aesthetic, the English listener loves direct instruction." Program notes arrived later in continental Europe.

Program notes serve two purposes: to provide historical and background information on the piece and, if necessary, the composer, and to give the audience some sense of what to expect, and what possibly what to listen for, when listening to the work. With the presentation of contemporary pieces, it is common to include notes provided by the composer. Programs may include information about, and quotes or commentary from, the composer, conductor, or performers, as well as provide context regarding the musical era. Programs may also include information about the programmatic or absolute content of the music, including analysis, and may point out details such as themes, musical motifs, and sections or movements.

Notes

See also
Commission (music)
Dedication (art)
In Concert (disambiguation)
Premiere
Program music

External links
Guide to writing program notes for University of Wisconsin–Whitewater students
Guide to writing program notes for University of Melbourne students
Automatic Classical Music Programme Note Generator
Archive of program notes for use by orchestras of educational and community arts organizations

Live music
Music performance
Music publications